Juhan Maiste (born 10 August 1952 in Kehra) is an Estonian art historian.

In 1976 he graduated from Tartu State  University with a degree in art history. Since 2007 he has been a professor at the University of Tartu.

Since 2009 he is the chief editor of the Baltic Journal of Art History.

Awards
 2002: Order of the White Star, IV class.

Publications

 1993: "Ajan sydämessä: matka Tallinnasta Tarttoon". Translated by Kaisu Lahikainen. Helsinki: Tammi. 216 pp. ISBN 951-3099563
 1995: "Linnoissa kreivien: Viron kartanoita ja kartanokulttuuria". Suomentanut Juhani Salokannel. Helsinki: Otava. 224 pp. ISBN 951-1134183
 1995: "Mustpeade maja. The house of the Brotherhood of Blackheads". Tallinn: Kunst. 127 pp. ISBN 951-9200979
 1996: " Eestimaa mõisad. Manorial architecture in Estonia. Gutsarchitektur in Estland". Tallinn: Kunst. 454 pp. ISBN 998-9200235
 1999: "Eesti. Minevik ja tänapäev. Estonia. Past and present. Estland. Vergangenheit und Gegenwart". Tallinn: Koolibri. 96 pp. ISBN 998-5008022
 2007: "Eesti kunsti lugu". Tallinn: Varrak. 519 pp. ISBN 978-9985315545
 2007: "Tuldud teed edasi. Along the trodden path". Tallinn: J. Maiste. 374 pp. ISBN 978-9949155446
 2014: "101 Eesti mõisa". Tallinn: Varrak. 224 pp. ISBN 978-9985329238

References

Living people
1952 births
Estonian art historians
University of Tartu alumni
Academic staff of the University of Tartu
Recipients of the Order of the White Star, 4th Class
People from Kehra